Élie Gagnebin (4 February 1891 – 16 July 1949) was a Swiss professor of geology at the University of Lausanne. He worked on the geology of the prealps. He also contributed greatly by writing popular treatises on the geology of the region and of the earth in general. Trained in the arts, he also wrote poetry and on philosophical matters.

Gagnebin was born in Liege to Protestant pastor Henri-Auguste and his wife Adolphine née Heshuysen of Dutch ancestry. The family moved to Switzerland in 1892 and Gagnebin grew up in Lausanne where he received a bachelor's degree in literature (1909) followed by a degree in science (1912). He then interned in Paris and Grenoble and joined as an assistant lecturer at the University of Lausanne in 1912 becoming a professor in 1933. His work was on the geology of the Romand and Chablais prealps and the Lake Geneva Quaternary. He also popularized the work of Alfred Wegener in France in 1922. A student of Maurice Lugeon, he replaced his position in 1940.

References

External links 
 Biography (in French)

1891 births
1949 deaths
Swiss geologists
Academic staff of the University of Lausanne
People from Liège
Swiss people of Dutch descent
Belgian emigrants to Switzerland